Buków may refer to the following places in Poland:
Buków, Lower Silesian Voivodeship (south-west Poland)
Buków, Łódź Voivodeship (central Poland)
Buków, Lesser Poland Voivodeship (south Poland)
Buków, Subcarpathian Voivodeship (south-east Poland)
Buków, Silesian Voivodeship (south Poland)
Buków, Lubusz Voivodeship (west Poland)
Buków, Opole Voivodeship (south-west Poland)